John Norman Abelson (born 1938 in Grand Coulee, Washington) is an American molecular biologist with expertise in biophysics, biochemistry, and genetics. He was a professor at the California Institute of Technology (Caltech).

Biography
Abelson graduated in 1960 with a bachelor's degree in physics from Washington State University. He obtained his Ph.D. in biophysics from Johns Hopkins University in 1965. He then did a postdoctoral fellowship in biochemistry at the MRC Laboratory of Molecular Biology, Molecular Genetics Division, Cambridge, England, where he worked with Sydney Brenner and Francis Crick on the mechanism of nonsense suppressors in E.coli. This work involved both genetics and RNA sequencing (developed at that time by Fred Sanger).

His first faculty position was in the Department of Chemistry at the University of California, San Diego in 1968.

In 1978, Abelson and his colleague Mel Simon founded Agouron Institute, a non-profit research organization that sponsors innovative research in biology. He is the president and executive director of the institute.

The institute has a substantial endowment because it founded a for-profit-company, Agouron Pharmaceuticals, six years later. This company, a pioneer in rational drug design, discovered and brought to market Viracept, a leading drug used for controlling HIV infections. In 1999, the company was bought by Warner Lambert for $2.1 Billion, and in 2000 Warner Lambert was acquired by Pfizer Incorporated. The institute has funded more than $60 million of research in the fields of structural biology, geobiology and microbial ecology.

Abelson was a Guggenheim Fellow for the academic year 1980–1981. In 1982 he joined the faculty at Caltech. He chaired the Division of Biology there and became the George Beadle Professor of Biology in 1991. He retired in 2002 and lives in San Francisco, where he currently works with his wife, Christine Guthrie, a noted RNA biochemist, geneticist and Professor at UCSF.

Abelson was a key figure in the elucidation of RNA splicing, in collaboration with his wife, noted geneticist Christine Guthrie. His work has made possible an understanding of how genomic DNA can be transcribed and the transcripts processed to both messenger RNA and transfer RNA, particularly when there are introns present in the genome. He identified the enzymes that cleave RNA precursors into fragments, and elucidated the mechanisms by which fragments are spliced together to make the functional RNA.

He was elected to the National Academy of Sciences in 1985. The same year Abelson was elected a Fellow of the American Academy of Arts and Sciences. In 2001, he was elected to the American Philosophical Society. He is currently an editor of the influential scientific book series, Methods in Enzymology.

See also 
List of RNA biologists

Note 

His uncle, Philip Abelson, a physicist, was the longtime editor of Science and his aunt, Neva Martin Abelson co-developed the blood test for Rh factor.

References

External links
John Abelson's Caltech home page
University Names John Abelson Recipient of its Highest Alumni Award on Washington State University site
Roberts & Company Publishers
PNAS Bio

1938 births
Living people
Members of the United States National Academy of Sciences
American biochemists
American geneticists
Fellows of the American Academy of Arts and Sciences
People from Grant County, Washington
California Institute of Technology faculty
University of California, San Diego faculty
Washington State University alumni
Johns Hopkins University alumni